Carole Johnson may refer to:

Carole Johnson (dancer) (born 1940), an African American dancer, choreographer and administrator who played an important role in the development of Indigenous Australian contemporary dance
 Carole Johnson (health official), administrator of Health Resources and Services Administration since January 2022
Carole Johnson, a beauty queen who was Miss West Virginia, U.S. in 1961
Carole Johnson, Labour candidate in the 2021 Bristol City Council election, UK

See also
Carol Johnson (disambiguation)